

Films featuring the Parachute Regiment 

 Theirs Is the Glory (1946)
 The Red Beret (1953)
 The Longest Day (1962)
 A Bridge Too Far (1977)
 Geheimcode: Wildgänse (1984)
 Kommando Leopard (1985)
 Bloody Sunday (2002)
 Dead Man's Shoes(2004)
 The Last Drop (2005)
 Outlaw (2007)
 Cars 2 (2011)
 Kajaki (2014)

TV shows featuring the Parachute Regiment 

 The Sandbaggers (1978)
 The Paras, BBC (1983)
 Contact (1985)
 Civvies (1992)
 P-Company, Channel 4 Documentary (1992)
 Band of Brothers episode 5: Crossroads (2001)
 Ultimate Force (2002)
 Doctor Who episode: Aliens of London (2005)

Video Games featuring the Parachute Regiment 
 Call of Duty 3 (2006)
 Wolfenstein The New Order (2014)
 Call of Duty: WWII (2016)
 Battlefield 5 (2016)
 Call of Duty: Vanguard (2021)

Parachute Regiment (United Kingdom)